The 2011 ITM Cup season was the sixth season of New Zealand's provincial rugby union competition since it turned professional in 2006. The regular season began on July 14, when Otago hosted North Harbour. It involved the top fourteen rugby unions of New Zealand. For sponsorship reasons, the competition was known as the ITM Cup and it was the second season under the lead sponsor. The winner of the Championship, Hawke's Bay was promoted to the Premiership, the seventh placed Premiership team, Southland was relegated to the Championship.

Format
The ITM Cup standings were sorted by a competition points system. Four points were awarded to the winning team, a draw equaled two points, whilst a loss amounted to zero points. Unions could also win their side a respectable bonus point. To receive a bonus point, they must have scored four tries or more or lose by seven or fewer points or less. Each team was placed on their total points received. If necessary of a tiebreaker, when two or more teams finish on equal points, the union who defeated the other in a head-to-head got placed higher. In case of a draw between them, the side with the biggest points deferential margin got rights to be ranked above. If they were tied on points difference, it was then decided by a highest scored try count or a coin toss. This seeding format was implemented since the beginning of the 2006 competition.

The competition included a promotion-relegation process with the winner of the Championship receiving automatic promotion to the Premiership, replacing the seventh-placed team in the Premiership which was relegated to the Championship for the following year. The regular season consisted of two types of matches. The internal division matches were when each team played the other six unions in their division once, home or away. The cross-division matches were when each team played four teams from the other division, thus missing out on three teams, each from the opposite division. Each union played home or away games against teams from the other division, making a total of ten competition games for each union. The finals format allowed the top four teams from each division move on to the semi-finals. The top two division winners, based on table points, received a home semi-final. In the first round of the finals, the semi-finals, the second division winner hosted the third division winner, and the first division winner hosted the fourth division winner. The final was hosted by the top remaining seed.

Standings
Source: ITM Cup standings 2011

Standings progression

Regular season
The 2011 ITM Cup was played across eight weeks with every team playing three Tuesday or Wednesday night fixtures in a double-up round where they played twice that week. The competition started on Thursday, July 14, with Otago taking on North Harbour at Carisbrook. Due to the 2011 Rugby World Cup being hosted in New Zealand, the competition finished without semi-finals so that the World Cup could be held in September and October. The Otago and Manawatu fixture was cancelled in Week 6 of the competition due to weather and airport closures.

Week 1

Week 2

Week 3

Week 4

Week 5

Week 6

Week 7

Week 8

Play-offs

Finals

{| border="0" width="100%" 
|-
|

Statistics

Leading point scorers

Source: The weekly reviews of the matches published on provincial.rugby (see "Report" in the individual match scoring stats).

Leading try scorers

Source: The weekly reviews of the matches published on provincial.rugby (see "Report" in the individual match scoring stats).

Points by week

Source: ITM Cup Fixtures and Results 2011

Tries by week

Source: The weekly reviews of the matches published on provincial.rugby (see "Report" in the individual match scoring stats).

Sanctions

Ranfurly Shield

Pre-season challenges

References

External links

National Provincial Championship
2011 in New Zealand rugby union
2011 rugby union tournaments for clubs